"One Up" is a song by British rapper and songwriter Central Cee. It was released on 13 October 2022 as the lead single from his EP, No More Leaks.

Music video
The video, directed by Suave, shows Central Cee driving around London and stopping at the studio.

Charts

References

2022 singles
2022 songs
Central Cee songs
Songs written by Central Cee